The ice hockey team rosters at the 1928 Winter Olympics consisted of the following players:

Austria
Head coach: Edgar Dietrichstein

Belgium
Head coach: Jean de Craene

Canada
Head coach: Conn Smythe

Czechoslovakia
Head coach: František Lorenz

France

Germany
Head coach: Erich Römer

Great Britain

Hungary 
Head coach:  Phil Taylor

Poland
Head coach: Tadeusz Adamowski

Sweden
Head coaches: Viking Harbom

Switzerland
Head coach:  Bobby Bell

References

Sources

Hockey Hall Of Fame page on the 1928 Olympics

rosters
1928